Kafur is a Local Government Area in Katsina State, Nigeria. Its headquarters are in the town of Kafur.

It has an area of 1,106 km and a population of 202,884 at the 2006 census.

Wards in Kafur
Dantutture
Dutsen Kura/Kanya
Gamzago
Kafur
Mahuta
Masari
Sabuwar Kasa
Yari Bori
Yartalata/Rigoji
Gozaki

The postal code of the area is 832.

References

Local Government Areas in Katsina State